SubtractiveLAD is the electronic/ambient music project of Stephen Hummel, from Vancouver, British Columbia, Canada.

Discography
Giving Up The Ghost (2005)
Suture (2006)
No Man's Land (2007)
Apparatus (2008)
Where The Land Meets The Sky (2009)
Life at the End of the World (2010)
Kindred (2011)
The Language of Flowers (2013)
First Steps (2014)
Wilderness (2014)
Paths (2014)
Nucleus (2016)
Sustain/Release (2017)
Valve (2017)
Ellipsis (2017)
Ritual (2017)
Signal (2018)
Past the Horizon (2018)
Everything We Failed to Be (2018)
Within and Without (2018)
Calm (2019)
Parabola (2019)
The Time After the Time Before (2019)
The Echo and the Man (2019)
Skin and Bones (2020)
Mercy (2020)
The Middle of Nowhere (2020)
Aftermath (2021)
Static Clouds (2021)
Weightless (2021)
Rising Tide (2021)
Fade (2021)
Granular Electric Guitar (2021)
Without Your Love (2021)
Wreckage (2022)

Film Music 
 Fierce Light
 Glorious
 Build It

References

External links
https://subtractivelad.com/
http://www.n5md.com/artists.php?artist=SubtractiveLAD
Articles
 P2P :: A potential solution to appease file-sharers and artists?
Interviews
 The Big Takeover 2011
 Igloo Magazine 2010
 [sic] Magazine 2010
 Igloo Magazine 2007

Canadian electronic musicians
1974 births
Living people
Musicians from Vancouver